Andy Diouf (born 17 May 2003) is a French professional footballer who plays as a forward for Swiss club Basel on loan from Rennes.

Early life 
Born in Neuilly-sur-Seine, Diouf was raised in Nanterre. He started playing football at the age of 6 years, in the nearby La Garenne-Colombes.

Club career 
Diouf played for the youth teams of Paris Saint-Germain and AC Boulogne-Billancourt, also spending two years at the INF Clairefontaine, before joining the Stade Rennais Academy in 2015.

He made his professional debut for Rennes on 9 May 2021, coming on as a substitute in a 1–1 Ligue 1 home draw against his former club of Paris SG.

On 18 July 2022, Diouf joined Basel in Switzerland on a season-long loan with an option to buy. He joined Basel's first team for their 2022–23 season under head coach Alexander Frei. Diouf played his domestic league debut for his new  club on 24 July 2022 in the home game in the St. Jakob Stadium as Basel played a 1–1 draw against Servette.

International career
Born in France, Diouf is of Senegalese descent. He is a youth international for France.

References

External links
 
 

2003 births
Living people
People from Nanterre
French footballers
France youth international footballers
French sportspeople of Senegalese descent
Association football forwards
Stade Rennais F.C. players
FC Basel players
Ligue 1 players
Championnat National 3 players
Swiss Super League players
Footballers from Hauts-de-Seine
French expatriate footballers
Expatriate footballers in Switzerland
French expatriate sportspeople in Switzerland